Masdevallia uniflora is a species of orchid endemic to Peru (Junín). It is the type species of the genus Masdevallia.

References

External links 

uniflora
Endemic orchids of Peru
Junín Region